Cecil James Olaf Moorhouse (1 January 1924 – 6 January 2014)  was a British politician and former Member of the European Parliament.

He was educated at St Paul's School, London, King's College London (BSc Eng, 1945) and Imperial College London where here took a diploma in advanced aeronautics. He served as Conservative MEP for London South from 1979 to 1984, and as Conservative MEP for London South and Surrey East from 1984 until October 1998 when he "defected to the Liberal Democrats after disagreeing with Mr Hague's policy on the euro." He remained in the European Parliament as Liberal Democrat MEP for London South and Surrey East until 1999.

References

1924 births
2014 deaths
People educated at St Paul's School, London
Alumni of King's College London
Alumni of Imperial College London
Conservative Party (UK) MEPs
Liberal Democrats (UK) MEPs
MEPs for England 1979–1984
MEPs for England 1984–1989
MEPs for England 1989–1994
MEPs for England 1994–1999